The Albany Night Boat is a 1928 American silent drama film directed by Alfred Raboch and starring Olive Borden, Ralph Emerson and Duke Martin. It was produced and distributed by the independent Tiffany Pictures, one of the largest companies outside the major studios.

Synopsis
Ken, the searchlight operator on the night boat to Albany rescues Georgie from drowning in the Hudson River after she jumps off a yacht. The two get married but their happiness is threatened by Ken's colleague Steve who attempts to seduce her.

Cast
 Olive Borden as 	Georgie
 Ralph Emerson as Ken
 Duke Martin as Steve
 Nellie Bryden as 	Morth Crary
 Helen Marlowe as The Blonde

References

Bibliography
 Connelly, Robert B. The Silents: Silent Feature Films, 1910-36, Volume 40, Issue 2. December Press, 1998.
 Munden, Kenneth White. The American Film Institute Catalog of Motion Pictures Produced in the United States, Part 1. University of California Press, 1997.

External links
 

1928 films
1928 drama films
1920s English-language films
American silent feature films
Silent American drama films
American black-and-white films
Films directed by Alfred Raboch
Tiffany Pictures films
Films set in New York (state)
1920s American films